Ingwiller is a commune in the Bas-Rhin department in Grand Est in north-eastern France.

The commune lies within the North-Vosges natural park.

History
The first known mention of Ingwiller dates from the year 742 a.C. as Ingoniunilare, 785 as Ilununilare, 1175 as Ingichwilre and 1178 in a bulla of the Pope Alexander III as Ingevilre.

On demand of Simon von Lichtenberg, the Emperor Louis IV the Bavarian imposed the village Ingveiler in the year 1345 to the town Ingveiler.<ref>Strobel and Engelmann: Vaterländische Geschichte des Elsaß, Straßburg 1840–49</ref>

With the end of the Franco-Prussian War in the year 1870/71 Alsace-Lorraine became part of the German Empire. 166 inhabitants of the town Ingwiller took the option'' of the Treaty of Frankfurt (1871) to remain French citizens and therefore had to leave Alsace-Lorraine towards Southern France.

People
 Norbert Cohn (1904–1989): Jazz musician born in Ingwiller.

See also
 Communes of the Bas-Rhin department

References

Communes of Bas-Rhin
Bas-Rhin communes articles needing translation from French Wikipedia